Copts are a Christian ethnoreligious group indigenous to North Africa who have primarily inhabited the area of modern Egypt and Sudan since antiquity. Most ethnic Copts are Coptic Oriental Orthodox Christians. They are the largest Christian denomination in Egypt and the Middle East, as well as in Sudan and Libya. Copts have historically spoken the Coptic language, a direct descendant of the Demotic Egyptian that was spoken in late antiquity.

Originally referring to all Egyptians, the term Copt became synonymous with native Christians in light of Egypt's Islamization and Arabization after the Muslim conquest of Egypt in the 7th century. Copts in Egypt account for roughly 5–20 percent of the Egyptian population, although the exact percentage is unknown; Copts in Sudan account for 1 percent of the Sudanese population while Copts in Libya similarly account for 1 percent of the Libyan population.

Following the Arab conquest of Egypt in 639–646 AD, the treatment of the Copts ranged from relative tolerance to open persecution. Historically, the Copts suffered from "waves of persecution giving way to relative tolerance in cycles that varied according to the local ruler and other political and economic circumstances". Persecution is significantly involved to the Copts' ethnic identity due to historic and current conflicts. Most Copts adhere to the Coptic Orthodox Church of Alexandria, an Oriental Orthodox Church. The smaller Coptic Catholic Church is an Eastern Catholic Church, in communion with the Holy See of Rome; others belong to the Evangelical Church of Egypt. The Copts played a central role in the Arab Renaissance as well as the modernization of Egypt and the Arab world as a whole; they also contributed to the "social and political life and key debates such as Pan-Arabism, good governance, educational reform, and democracy", and they have historically flourished in business affairs.

Copts maintain a distinct ethnic identity and generally reject an Arab identity. In Egypt, Copts have a relatively higher educational attainment, a relatively higher wealth index, and a stronger representation in white-collar job types, but limited representation in military and security agencies. The majority of demographic, socio-economic, and health indicators are similar among Christians and Muslims.

Etymology 

The English language adopted the word Copt in the 17th century from New Latin Coptus, Cophtus, which derives from the Arabic collective   "the Copts" with nisba adjective  , plural  ; Also quftī, qiftī (where the Arabic  reflects the historical Coptic ) an Arabisation of the Coptic word ⲁⲓⲅⲩⲡⲧⲓⲟⲛ aiguption (Bohairic) or ⲕⲩⲡⲧⲁⲓⲟⲛ kuptaion (Sahidic). The Coptic word in turn represents an adaptation of the Greek term for the indigenous people of Egypt, .

The Greek term for Egypt, Aígyptos, itself derives from the Egyptian language, but dates to a much earlier period, being attested already in Mycenaean Greek as a3-ku-pi-ti-jo (lit. "Egyptian"; used here as a man's name). This Mycenaean form is likely from Middle Egyptian  (reconstructed pronunciation /ħawitˌkuʀpiˈtaħ/ → /ħajiʔˌkuʀpiˈtaħ/ → /ħəjˌkuʔpəˈtaħ/, Egyptological pronunciation Hut-ka-Ptah), literally "estate/palace of the kꜣ ("double" spirit) of Ptah" (compare Akkadian ), the name of the temple complex of the god Ptah at Memphis (and a synecdoche for the city of Memphis and the region around it).

The term Aigýptios in Greek came to designate the native Egyptian population in Roman Egypt (as distinct from Greeks, Romans, Jews, etc.). After the Muslim conquest of Egypt (639-646) it became restricted to those Egyptians adhering to the Christian religion.

The Coptic name for Egyptians, remənkhēmi, is realized in the Fayyumic Coptic as ⲗⲉⲙⲛ̀ⲕⲏⲙⲉ lemenkēmi and as ⲣⲉⲙⲛ̀ⲕⲏⲙⲉ remənkēme in the Sahidic dialect; cf. Egyptian , Demotic .

The Arabic word  "Copt" has also been connected to the Greek name of the town of Kóptos (now Qifṭ; Coptic Kebt and Keft) in Upper Egypt. This association may have contributed to making "Copt" the settled form of the name.

In the 20th century some Egyptian nationalists and intellectuals in the context of Pharaonism began using the term  in the historical sense.

History 

The Copts are one of the oldest Christian communities in the Middle East. Although integrated in the larger Egyptian nation state, the Copts have survived as a distinct religious community forming around 5 to 20 percent of the population, though estimates vary. They pride themselves on the apostolicity of the Egyptian Church whose founder was the first in an unbroken chain of patriarchs. The main body has been out of communion with the Roman Catholic Church (in Rome) since the 5th century AD.

Foundation of the Christian Church in Egypt 
According to ancient tradition, Christianity was introduced within present day Egypt by Saint Mark in Alexandria, shortly after the ascension of Christ and during the reign of the Roman emperor Claudius around 42 AD. The legacy that Saint Mark left in Egypt was a considerable Christian community in Alexandria. From Alexandria, Christianity spread throughout Egypt within half a century of Saint Mark's arrival in Alexandria, as is clear from a fragment of the Gospel of John, written in Coptic, which was found in Upper Egypt and can be dated to the first half of the 2nd century, and the New Testament writings found in Oxyrhynchus, in Middle Egypt, which date around the year 200 AD. In the 2nd century, Christianity began to spread to the rural areas, and scriptures were translated into the local language, today known as the Coptic language, but known as the Egyptian language at the time. By the beginning of the 3rd century AD, Christians constituted the majority of Egypt's population, and the Church of Alexandria was recognized as one of Christendom's four Apostolic Sees, second in honor only to the Church of Rome. The Church of Alexandria is therefore the oldest Christian church in Africa.

Contributions to Christianity 
The Copts in Egypt contributed immensely to Christian tradition. The Catechetical School of Alexandria was the oldest catechetical school in the world. Founded around 190 AD by the scholar Pantanaeus, the school of Alexandria became an important institution of religious learning, where students were taught by scholars such as Athenagoras, Clement, Didymus, and Origen, the father of theology who was also active in the field of commentary and comparative Biblical studies. However, the scope of this school was not limited to theological subjects; science, mathematics and humanities were also taught there. The question-and-answer method of commentary began there, and 15 centuries before Braille, wood-carving techniques were in use there by blind scholars to read and write.

Another major contribution made by the Copts in Egypt to Christianity was the creation and organization of monasticism. Worldwide Christian monasticism stems, either directly or indirectly, from the Egyptian example. The most prominent figures of the monastic movement were Anthony the Great, Paul of Thebes, Macarius the Great, Shenouda the Archimandrite and Pachomius the Cenobite. By the end of the 5th century, there were hundreds of monasteries, and thousands of cells and caves scattered throughout the Egyptian desert. Since then pilgrims have visited the Egyptian Desert Fathers to emulate their spiritual, disciplined lives. Saint Basil the Great Archbishop of Caesarea Mazaca, and the founder and organiser of the monastic movement in Asia Minor, visited Egypt around 357 AD and his monastic rules are followed by the Eastern Orthodox Churches. Saint Jerome, who translated the Bible into Latin, came to Egypt while en route to Jerusalem around 400 AD and left details of his experiences in his letters. Saint Benedict founded the Benedictine Order in the 6th century on the model of Saint Pachomius, although in a stricter form. Coptic Christians practice male circumcision as a rite of passage.

Ecumenical councils 
The major contributions that the See of Alexandria has contributed to the establishment of early Christian theology and dogma are attested to by fact that the first three ecumenical councils in the history of Christianity were headed by Egyptian patriarchs. The Council of Nicaea (325 AD) was presided over by St. Alexander, Patriarch of Alexandria, along with Saint Hosius of Córdoba. In addition, the most prominent figure of the council was the future Patriarch of Alexandria Athanasius, who played the major role in the formulation of the Nicene Creed, recited today in most Christian churches of different denominations. One of the council's decisions was to entrust the Patriarch of Alexandria with calculating and annually announcing the exact date of Easter to the rest of the Christian churches. The Council of Constantinople (381 AD) was presided over by Patriarch Timothy of Alexandria, while the Council of Ephesus (431 AD) was presided over by Cyril of Alexandria.

Council of Chalcedon 
In 451 AD, following the Council of Chalcedon, the Church of Alexandria was divided into two branches. Those who accepted the terms of the Council became known as Chalcedonians or Melkites. Those who did not abide by the council's terms were labeled non-Chalcedonians or Monophysites and later Jacobite's after Jacob Baradaeus. The non-Chalcedonians, however, rejected the term Monophysites as erroneous and referred to themselves as Miaphysites. The majority of the Egyptians belonged to the Miaphysite branch, which led to their persecution by the Byzantines in Egypt.

Arab conquest of Egypt 

In 641 AD, Egypt was conquered by the Arabs who faced off with the Byzantine army. Local resistance by the Egyptians however began to materialize shortly thereafter and would last until at least the 9th century. Despite the political upheaval, Egypt remained mainly Christian, but Coptic Christians lost their majority status after the 14th century, as a result of the intermittent persecution and the destruction of the Christian churches there. From the Muslim conquest of Egypt onwards, the Coptic Christians were persecuted by  different Muslim regimes, such as the Umayyad Caliphate, Abbasid Caliphate, Fatimid Caliphate, Mamluk Sultanate, and Ottoman Empire; the persecution of Coptic Christians included closing and demolishing churches, forced conversion to Islam, and heavy taxes for those who refused to convert.

Copts in modern Egypt 

Under Muslim rule, Christians paid special taxes and had lower access to political power, but were exempt from military service. Their position improved dramatically under the rule of Muhammad Ali in the early 19th century. He abolished the Jizya (a tax on non-Muslims) and allowed Egyptians (Copts) to enroll in the army. Pope Cyril IV, 1854–61, reformed the church and encouraged broader Coptic participation in Egyptian affairs. Khedive Isma'il Pasha, in power 1863–79, further promoted the Copts. He appointed them judges to Egyptian courts and awarded them political rights and representation in government. They flourished in business affairs.

Some Copts participated in the Egyptian national movement for independence and occupied many influential positions. Two significant cultural achievements include the founding of the Coptic Museum in 1910 and the Higher Institute of Coptic Studies in 1954. Some prominent Coptic thinkers from this period are Salama Moussa, Louis Awad and Secretary General of the Wafd Party Makram Ebeid.

In 1952, Gamal Abdel Nasser led some army officers in a coup d'état against King Farouk, which overthrew the Kingdom of Egypt and established a republic. Nasser's mainstream policy was pan-Arab nationalism and socialism. The Copts were severely affected by Nasser's nationalization policies, though they represented about 10 to 20 percent of the population. In addition, Nasser's pan-Arab policies undermined the Copts' strong attachment to and sense of identity about their Egyptian pre-Arab, and certainly non-Arab identity which resulted in permits to construct churches to be delayed along with Christian religious courts to be closed.

Socio-economic 
In Egypt, Copts have relatively higher educational attainment, relatively higher wealth index, and a stronger representation in white collar job types, but limited representation in security agencies. The majority of demographic, socioeconomic and health indicators are similar among Copts and Muslims. Historically; many Copts were accountants, and in 1961 Coptic Christians owned 51% of the Egyptian banks. A Pew Center study about religion and education around the world in 2016, found that around 26% of Egyptian Christians obtain a university degree in institutions of higher education.

According to the scholar Andrea Rugh Copts tend to belong to the educated middle and upper-middle class, and according to scholar Lois Farag "The Copts still played the major role in managing Egypt's state finances. They held 20% of total state capital, 45% of government employment, and 45% of government salarie". According to scholar J. D. Pennington 45% of the medical doctors, 60% of the pharmacists of Egypt were Christians.

A number of Coptic business and land-owning families became very wealthy and influential such as the Egyptian Coptic Christian Sawiris family that owns the Orascom conglomerate, spanning telecommunications, construction, tourism, industries and technology. In 2008, Forbes estimated the family's net worth at $36 billion. According to scholars Maristella Botticini and Zvi Eckstein argue that Copts have relatively higher educational attainment and relatively higher wealth index, due to Coptic Christianity emphasis on literacy and that Coptic Christianity encouraged the accumulation of human capital.

Pharaonism 

Many Coptic intellectuals hold to Pharaonism, which states that Coptic culture is largely derived from pre-Christian, Pharaonic culture, and is not indebted to Greece. It gives the Copts a claim to a deep heritage in Egyptian history and culture. Pharaonism was widely held by Coptic and Muslim scholars in the early 20th century, and it helped bridge the divide between those groups. Some scholars see Pharaonism as shaped by Orientalism.

Church affairs 

Today, members of the non-Chalcedonian Coptic Orthodox Church constitute the majority of the Egyptian Christian population. Mainly through emigration and partly through European, American, and other missionary work and conversions, the Egyptian Christian community now also includes other Christian denominations such as Protestants (known in Arabic as Evangelicals), Roman Catholics and Eastern Rite Catholics, and other Orthodox congregations. The term Coptic remains exclusive however to the Egyptian natives, as opposed to the Christians of non-Egyptian origins. Some Protestant churches for instance are called "Coptic Evangelical Church", thus helping differentiate their native Egyptian congregations from churches attended by non-Egyptian immigrant communities such as Europeans or Americans.

In 2005, a group of Coptic activists created a flag to represent Copts worldwide.

The previous head of the Coptic Orthodox Church, Pope Shenouda III of Alexandria, died 17 March 2012. On 4 November 2012, Bishop Tawadros was chosen as the new pope of Egypt's Coptic Christians. His name was selected from a glass bowl containing the three shortlisted candidates by a blindfolded boy at a ceremony in Cairo's St Mark's Cathedral.

Copts in modern Sudan 

Sudan has a native Coptic minority, although many Copts in Sudan are descended from more recent Egyptian immigrants.
Copts in Sudan live mostly in northern cities, including Al Obeid, Atbara, Dongola, Khartoum, Omdurman, Port Sudan, and Wad Medani. They number up to 500,000, or slightly over 1 percent of the Sudanese population. Due to their advanced education, their role in the life of the country has been more significant than their numbers suggest. They have occasionally faced forced conversion to Islam, resulting in their emigration and decrease in number.

Modern immigration of Copts to Sudan peaked in the early 19th century, and they generally received a tolerant welcome there. However, this was interrupted by a decade of persecution under Mahdist rule at the end of the 19th century. As a result of this persecution, many were forced to relinquish their faith, adopt Islam, and intermarry with the native Sudanese. The Anglo-Egyptian invasion in 1898 allowed Copts greater religious and economic freedom, and they extended their original roles as artisans and merchants into trading, banking, engineering, medicine, and the civil service. Proficiency in business and administration made them a privileged minority. However, the return of militant Islam in the mid-1960s and subsequent demands by radicals for an Islamic constitution prompted Copts to join in public opposition to religious rule.

Gaafar Nimeiry's introduction of Islamic Sharia law in 1983 began a new phase of oppressive treatment of Copts, among other non-Muslims. After the overthrow of Nimeiry, Coptic leaders supported a secular candidate in the 1986 elections. However, when the National Islamic Front overthrew the elected government of Sadiq al-Mahdi with the help of the military, discrimination against Copts returned in earnest. Hundreds of Copts were dismissed from the civil service and judiciary.

In February 1991, a Coptic pilot working for Sudan Airways was executed for illegal possession of foreign currency. Before his execution, he had been offered amnesty and money if he converted to Islam, but he refused. Thousands attended his funeral, and the execution was taken as a warning by many Copts, who began to flee the country.

Restrictions on the Copts' rights to Sudanese nationality followed, and it became difficult for them to obtain Sudanese nationality by birth or by naturalization, resulting in problems when attempting to travel abroad. The confiscation of Christian schools and the imposition of an Arab-Islamic emphasis in language and history teaching were accompanied by harassment of Christian children and the introduction of hijab dress laws. A Coptic child was flogged for failing to recite a Koranic verse. In contrast with the extensive media broadcasting of the Muslim Friday prayers, the radio ceased coverage of the Christian Sunday service. As the civil war raged throughout the 1990s, the government focused its religious fervor on the south. Although experiencing discrimination, the Copts and other long-established Christian groups in the north had fewer restrictions than other types of Christians in the south.

Today, the Coptic Church in Sudan is officially registered with the government, and is exempt from property tax. In 2005, the Sudanese government of National Unity (GNU) named a Coptic Orthodox priest to a government position, though the ruling Islamist party's continued dominance under the GNU provides ample reason to doubt its commitment to broader religious or ethnic representation.

Copts in modern Libya 

The largest Christian group in Libya is the Coptic Orthodox Church, with a population of 60,000. The Coptic Church is known to have historical roots in Libya long before the Arabs advanced westward from Egypt into Libya.

Demographics 

Living in countries with Muslim majorities (Egypt, Sudan, Libya), the size of the population of Copts is a continuously disputed matter, frequently for reasons of religious jealousy and animosity.

The Coptic population in Egypt is difficult to estimate because researchers are forbidden by Egyptian authorities to ask a survey participant's religion, although official estimates state that Coptic Christians represent 10 to 15 percent while other independent and Christian sources estimate much higher numbers, up to 25 percent of the population.

The Coptic population in Sudan is at about half a million or 1 percent of Sudanese population.

The Coptic population in Libya is about over 60,000 or 1 percent of Libyan population.

Diaspora 

Outside of the Coptic primary area of residence within parts of present-day Egypt (Copts in Egypt), Sudan (Copts in Sudan), and Libya (Copts in Libya), the largest Coptic diaspora population is located within the United States, Canada, and Australia. The numbers of the Censuses in the United States, Canada, and Australia are not fully correct since many Copts listed themselves in the 2011 Census mistakenly as either Egyptians, Sudanese, Libyans, Americans, Canadians or Australians and by this way reducing the Coptic population in the 2011 Census in the United States, Canada, and Australia respectively.

Nevertheless, the Coptic American (US) population is estimated to number about 200,000 (estimates of Coptic organizations ranging as high as a million). According to published accounts and several Coptic/US sources (including the US-Coptic Association), the Coptic Orthodox Church has between 700,000 and one million members in the United States (c. 2005–2007). The Coptic Canadian population is estimated to number about 50,000 (estimates of Coptic organizations ranging as high as 200,000). The Coptic Australian population is estimated to number about 100,000 (estimates of Coptic organizations ranging as high as 100,000).

Smaller communities are found in Kuwait, the United Kingdom,
France (45,000), South Africa.

Minor communities below 10,000 people are reported from Jordan (8,000 Copts), Lebanon (3,000 – 4,000 Copts), Germany (3,000 Copts), Austria (2,000 Copts), Switzerland (1,000 Copts), and elsewhere.

It is noted that Copts also live in Denmark, Greece, Italy, the Netherlands, Norway, Russia, and Sweden.

Persecution and discrimination in Egypt 

Religious freedom in Egypt is hampered to varying degrees by discriminatory and restrictive government policies. Coptic Christians, being the largest religious minority in Egypt, are also negatively affected. Copts have faced increasing marginalization after the 1952 coup d'état led by Gamal Abdel Nasser. Until recently, Christians were required to obtain presidential approval for even minor repairs in churches. Although the law was eased in 2005 by handing down the authority of approval to the governors, Copts continue to face many obstacles and restrictions in building new churches. These restrictions do not apply for building mosques.

The Coptic community has been targeted by hate crimes by Islamic extremists. The most significant was the 2000–01 El Kosheh attacks, in which Muslims and Christians were involved in bloody inter-religious clashes following a dispute between a Muslim and a Christian. In February 2001 a new Coptic church and 35 houses belonging to Christians were burned.

In 2006, one person attacked three churches in Alexandria, killing one person and injuring 5–16. The attacker was not linked to any organisation and described as "psychologically disturbed" by the Ministry of Interior. In May 2010, The Wall Street Journal reported increasing waves of mob attacks by Muslims against Copts. Despite frantic calls for help, the police typically arrived after the violence was over. The police also coerced the Copts to accept "reconciliation" with their attackers to avoid prosecuting them, with no Muslims convicted for any of the attacks. In Marsa Matrouh, a Bedouin mob of Muslims tried to attack Copts, with 400 Copts having to barricade themselves in their church while the mob destroyed 18 homes, 23 shops and 16 cars.

Members of U.S. Congress have expressed concern about "human trafficking" of Coptic women and girls who are victims of abductions, forced conversion to Islam, sexual exploitation and forced marriage to Muslim men.

Boutros Boutros-Ghali was a Copt who served as Egypt's foreign minister under President Anwar Sadat. Previously, only two Copts were in Egypt's governmental cabinet: Finance Minister Youssef Boutros Ghali and Environment Minister Magued George during former president Mubarak's rule. There also used to be one Coptic governor out of 25, that of the upper Egyptian governorate of Qena, and is the first Coptic governor in decades due to the higher concentration of Copts in Upper Egypt. In addition, Naguib Sawiris, Nassef Sawiris and Samih Sawiris, who are extremely successful businessmen and one of the world's 100 wealthiest people, are Copts. In 2002, under the Mubarak government, Coptic Christmas (January 7) was recognized as an official holiday. However, many Copts continue to complain of being minimally represented in higher positions in law enforcement, state security and public office, and of being discriminated against in the workforce on the basis of their religion.

While freedom of religion is guaranteed by the Egyptian constitution, according to Human Rights Watch, "Egyptians are able to convert to Islam generally without difficulty, but Muslims who convert to Christianity face difficulties in getting new identity papers and some have been arrested for allegedly forging such documents." The Coptic community, however, takes pains to prevent conversions from Christianity to Islam due to the ease with which Christians can often become Muslim. Public officials, being conservative themselves, intensify the complexity of the legal procedures required to recognize the religion change as required by law. Security agencies will sometimes claim that such conversions from Islam to Christianity (or occasionally vice versa) may stir social unrest, and thereby justify themselves in wrongfully detaining the subjects, insisting that they are simply taking steps to prevent likely social troubles from happening. In 2007, a Cairo administrative court denied 45 citizens the right to obtain identity papers documenting their reversion to Christianity after converting to Islam. However, in February 2008 the Supreme Administrative Court overturned the decision, allowing 12 citizens who had reverted to Christianity to re-list their religion on identity cards, but they will specify that they had adopted Islam for a brief period of time.

In August 2013, following the 3 July 2013 Coup and clashes between the military and Morsi supporters, there were widespread attacks on Coptic churches and institutions in Egypt by Sunni Muslims.
 According to at least one Egyptian scholar (Samuel Tadros), the attacks are the worst violence against the Coptic Church since the 14th century.

USA Today reported that "forty churches have been looted and torched, while 23 others have been attacked and heavily damaged". More than 45 churches across Egypt were attacked. The Facebook page of the Muslim Brotherhood's Freedom and Justice Party was "rife with false accusations meant to foment hatred against Copts". The Party's page claimed that the Coptic Church had declared "war against Islam and Muslims" and that "The Pope of the Church is involved in the removal of the first elected Islamist president. The Pope of the Church alleges Islamic Sharia is backwards, stubborn, and reactionary." On August 15, nine Egyptian human rights groups under the umbrella group "Egyptian Initiative for Personal Rights", released a statement saying, "In December … Brotherhood leaders began fomenting anti-Christian sectarian incitement. The anti-Coptic incitement and threats continued unabated up to the demonstrations of June 30 and, with the removal of President Morsi … morphed into sectarian violence, which was sanctioned by … the continued anti-Coptic rhetoric heard from the group's leaders on the stage … throughout the sit-in."

Coptic women and girls are abducted, forced to convert to Islam and marry Muslim men. In 2009 the Washington, D.C. based group Christian Solidarity International published a study of the abductions and forced marriages and the anguish felt by the young women because returning to Christianity is against the law. Further allegations of organised abduction of Copts, trafficking and police collusion continue in 2017.
	
In April 2010, a bipartisan group of 17 members of the U.S. Congress expressed concern to the State Department's Trafficking in Persons Office about Coptic women who faced "physical and sexual violence, captivity ... exploitation in forced domestic servitude or commercial sexual exploitation, and financial benefit to the individuals who secure the forced conversion of the victim."

According to the Egyptian NGO Association of Victims of Abduction and Forced Disappearance, between 2011 and March 2014, around 550 Coptic girls have been kidnapped, and forced to converted to Islam. According the same survey around 40% of the girls were raped prior to their conversion to Islam and married their captors.

Language 

The Coptic language is the most recent stage of the Egyptian language. Coptic should more correctly be used to refer to the script rather than the language itself. Even though this script was introduced as far back as the 1st century BC, it has been applied to the writing of the Egyptian language from the 1st century AD to the present day. Coptic remained the spoken language of most Egyptians until it was slowly replaced by colloquial Egyptian Arabic in Lower Egypt and Sa'idi Arabic in Upper Egypt by the end of the 17th century, although it may have survived in isolated pockets for a little longer.

Today Coptic is extinct but it is still the liturgical language of the native Egyptian Churches (the Coptic Orthodox Church and the Coptic Catholic Church). It is taught worldwide in many prestigious institutions, but its teaching within Egypt remains limited.

Dialects of the Coptic language:
 Sahidic: Theban or Upper Egyptian.
 Bohairic: The dialect of the Nile Delta and of the medieval and modern Coptic Church.
 Akhmimic
 Lycopolitan (also known as Subakhmimic)
 Fayyumic
 Oxyrhynchite

Calendar 

The Coptic calendar, also called the Alexandrian calendar, is used by the Coptic Orthodox Church and also by Ethiopia as its official calendar (with different names). This calendar is based on the ancient Egyptian calendar. To avoid the calendar creep of the latter, a reform of the ancient Egyptian calendar was introduced at the time of Ptolemy III (Decree of Canopus, in 238 BC) which consisted of the intercalation of a sixth epagomenal day every fourth year. However, this reform was opposed by the Egyptian priests, and the idea was not adopted until 25 BC, when the Roman Emperor Augustus formally reformed the calendar of Egypt, keeping it forever synchronized with the newly introduced Julian calendar. To distinguish it from the Ancient Egyptian calendar, which remained in use by some astronomers until medieval times, this reformed calendar is known as the Coptic calendar. Its years and months coincide with those of the Ethiopian calendar but have different numbers and names.

Coptic year 

The Coptic year is the extension of the ancient Egyptian civil year, retaining its subdivision into the three seasons, four months each. The three seasons are commemorated by special prayers in the Coptic liturgy. This calendar is still in use all over Egypt by farmers to keep track of the various agricultural seasons. The Coptic calendar has 13 months, 12 of 30 days each and an intercalary month at the end of the year of 5 or 6 days, depending whether the year is a leap year or not. The year starts on 29 August in the Julian Calendar or on the 30th in the year before (Julian) Leap Years. The Coptic Leap Year follows the same rules as the Julian Calendar so that the extra month always has six days in the year before a Julian Leap Year.

The Feast of Neyrouz marks the first day of the Coptic year. Ignorant of the Egyptian language for the most part, the Arabs confused the Egyptian new year's celebrations, which the Egyptians called the feast of Ni-Yarouou (the feast of the rivers), with the Persian feast of Nowruz. The misnomer remains today, and the celebrations of the Egyptian new year on the first day of the month of Thout are known as the Neyrouz. Its celebration falls on the first day of the month of Thout, the first month of the Egyptian year, which for AD 1901 to 2098 usually coincides with 11 September, except before a Gregorian leap year when it's September 12. Coptic years are counted from 284 AD, the year Diocletian became Roman Emperor, whose reign was marked by tortures and mass executions of Christians, especially in Egypt. Hence, the Coptic year is identified by the abbreviation A.M. (for Anno Martyrum or "Year of the Martyrs"). The A.M. abbreviation is also used for the unrelated Jewish year (Anno Mundi).

Every fourth Coptic year is a leap year without exception, as in the Julian calendar, so the above-mentioned new year dates apply only between AD 1900 and 2099 inclusive in the Gregorian Calendar. In the Julian Calendar, the new year is always 29 August, except before a Julian leap year when it's August 30. Easter is reckoned by the Julian Calendar in the Old Calendarist way.

To obtain the Coptic year number, subtract from the Julian year number either 283 (before the Julian new year) or 284 (after it).

Genetics 
According to Y-DNA analysis by Hassan et al. (2008), around 45% of Copts in Sudan carry the Haplogroup J. The remainder mainly belong to the E1b1b clade (21%). Both paternal lineages are common among other local Afroasiatic-speaking populations (Beja, Ethiopians, Sudanese Arabs), as well as the Nubians. E1b1b/E3b reaches its highest frequencies among North Africans, Levantine Middle Easterners, and Ethiopid East Africans. The next most common haplogroups borne by Copts are the European-linked R1b clade (15%), as well as the archaic African B lineage (15%).

Maternally, Hassan (2009) found that Copts in Sudan exclusively carry various descendants of the macrohaplogroup N. This mtDNA clade is likewise closely associated with local Afroasiatic-speaking populations, including Berbers and Ethiopid peoples. Of the N derivatives borne by Copts, U6 is most frequent (28%), followed by the haplogroup T (17%).

A 2015 study by Dobon et al. identified an ancestral autosomal component of Western Eurasian origin that is common to many modern Afroasiatic-speaking populations in Northeast Africa. Known as the Coptic component, it peaks among Egyptian Copts who settled in Sudan over the past two centuries. In their analysis, Sudan's Copts formed a separated group in the PCA, a close outlier to other Egyptians, Afro-Asiatic-speaking Northeast Africans and Middle East populations. The scientists suggest that this points to a common origin for the general population of Egypt, or Middle Eastern and North African populations. Copts in general shared the same main ancestral component with North African/Middle Eastern populations. They also associate the Coptic component with Ancient Egyptian ancestry, without the later Arabian influence that is present among other Egyptians.

Hollfelder et al. (2017) analysed various populations in Sudan and observed that Egyptians and Copts showed low levels of genetic differentiation and lower levels of genetic diversity compared to the northeast African groups. Copts and Egyptians displayed similar levels of European or Middle Eastern ancestry (Copts were estimated to be of 69.54% ± 2.57 European ancestry, and the Egyptians of 70.65% ± 2.47 European ancestry). The authors concluded that the Copts and the Egyptians have a common history linked to smaller population sizes, and that Sudanese Copts have remained relatively isolated since their arrival to Sudan with only low levels of admixture with local northeastern Sudanese groups.

An allele frequency comparative study conducted in 2020 between the two main Egyptian ethnic groups, Muslims and Christians, supported the conclusion that Egyptian Muslims and Egyptian Christians genetically originate from the same ancestors.

Prominent Copts 

Some famous Copts include:
 Hani Azer, prominent civil engineer
 Halim El-Dabh, Egyptian-American musician and academic
 Boutros Boutros-Ghali, the sixth Secretary-General of the United Nations.
 Rami Malek, an Egyptian-American actor of Coptic origins.
 Mena Massoud, an Egyptian-Canadian actor.
 Dina Powell, American Politician.
 Fayez Sarofim, heir to the Sarofim family fortune.
 Naguib Sawiris, the CEO of Orascom.
 Magdi Yacoub, Egyptian-British cardiothoracic surgeon.

See also 

 Aegyptos, in Greek mythology
 Coptic art
 Coptic Catholic Church
 Coptic diaspora
 Coptic identity
 Coptic language
 Coptic literature
 Copto-Arabic literature
 Coptic Museum
 Coptic Orthodox Church
 Coptic Saints
 Coptology
 Christianity in Egypt
 Christianity in Sudan
 Christianity in Libya
 List of prominent Copts worldwide

Footnotes

Further reading 

 
 Capuani, Massimo et al. Christian Egypt: Coptic Art and Monuments Through Two Millennia (2002) excerpt and text search
 
 Courbage, Youssef and Phillipe Fargues. Judy Mabro (Translator) Christians and Jews Under Islam, 1997.
 Ibrahim, Vivian. The Copts of Egypt: The Challenges of Modernisation and Identity (I.B. Tauris, distributed by Palgrave Macmillan; 2011) 258 pages; examines historical relations between Coptic Christians and the Egyptian state and describes factionalism and activism in the community.
 Kamil, Jill. Coptic Egypt: History and a Guide. Revised Ed. American University in Cairo Press, 1990.
 Meinardus, Otto Friedrich August. Two Thousand Years of Coptic Christianity (2010)
 
 
 
 Van Doorn-Harder, Nelly. "Finding a Platform: Studying the Copts in the 19th and 20th Centuries" International Journal of Middle East Studies (Aug 2010) 42#3 pp 479–482. Historiography

External links 

 Worldwide Coptic Directory
 Copts United Newspaper
 Coptic Cairo
 U.S. Department of State International Religious Freedom Report: Egypt

Afroasiatic peoples
 
Egyptian Christians
Indigenous peoples of North Africa
Coptic Orthodox Church
Oriental Orthodoxy in Egypt
Oriental Orthodoxy in Sudan
Oriental Orthodoxy in Libya
Ethnic groups in Egypt
Ethnic groups in Sudan
Ethnic groups in Libya
Christian terminology
North African people
Ethnoreligious groups
Ancient peoples of Africa
Ethnic groups in the Middle East